Shattuck-St. Mary's (also known as Shattuck-St. Mary's School, Shattuck, or simply SSM) is a coeducational Episcopal-affiliated boarding school in Faribault, Minnesota, United States.  Established in 1858 as an Episcopal mission school and seminary, within a decade the school grew to include Shattuck Military Academy, St. Mary's Hall for girls and later (in 1901) St. James School for younger boys. In 1974, the three schools dropped all military programs and combined as Shattuck-St. Mary's. It is now known for its Centers of Excellence programs in engineering, bioscience, pre-conservatory music, and vocal performance, as well as hockey, soccer, figure skating, and golf. Approximately 70% of its students are boarders.

National recognition
SSM categorizes education areas in a classification the school calls "Centers of Excellence," comprising bioscience, engineering, figure skating, golf, ice hockey, soccer, pre-conservatory music, and vocal performance.

SSM has won 25 USA Hockey national championships and has been runner-up 10 times among five of its top teams: 
Boys Prep (U-17/U-18): National champions in 1999, 2001, 2003, 2005, 2007, 2008, 2011, 2012, and 2014. Runners-up in 2004.
Girls Prep (U-19): National champions in 2005, 2006, 2007, 2009, 2011, 2016, 2017, and 2018. Runners-up in 2014 and 2015. 
Boys U-16: National champions in 2015 and 2016. Runners-up in 2004, 2007, 2011, and 2017.
Girls U-16: National champions 2010, 2013, 2014, 2015, and 2016.
Boys U-14: National champions in 2014 and 2016. Runners-up in 2003, 2005, and 2013.

SSM's soccer program has also had success in the U.S. Soccer Development Academy league. In the 2012–13 season, SSM's Boys U17/U18 team placed first in its division, and later became national runners-up, losing to the New York Red Bulls in overtime. In the 2013–14 season, the team placed second in its division.

In 1871 a St. Mary's biology instructor initially discovered a federal- and state-listed endangered species, the dwarf trout lily, on the school's campus.

History

On June 3, 1858, in a small rented building in Faribault, Minnesota, the Rev. Dr. James Lloyd Breck established the Episcopal mission school and seminary from which Shattuck-St. Mary's School has developed. When it opened, there were 45 young girls and boys and six divinity students. About this time, the newly established Episcopal Diocese of Minnesota selected Henry Benjamin Whipple as its first bishop. In 1860, Whipple took over the reins of the school, changing Breck's ambitious plan for "Bishop Seabury University" into "an honest school." In 1864, the school moved to its present site on the bluffs above the Straight River. With this change, the institution became a boarding school for young men and boys. In 1865, Tommy Crump, an English divinity student recently returned from the Civil War, started training the boys in military foot drill, with the boys using sticks as stand-ins for rifles. This began a military program that lasted for more than a century; during this time the campus was known as the Shattuck Military Academy.

In 1866, Whipple opened a school for girls, St. Mary's Hall, in his home in downtown Faribault. The girls remained there until 1872 when Whipple moved to a new house and St. Mary's Hall was turned over to a board of trustees. By 1883, St. Mary's had also outgrown its downtown facilities, and a grand, ornate building, often called "the Castle on the Rhine", was built on the bluffs, less than half a mile south of Shattuck. That building burned in 1924, and the limestone structure that stands today was built less than a year later.

Both schools saw rapid growth during the next few years. James Dobbin, who succeeded Breck in 1866 and served as Rector of Shattuck School until 1914, was responsible for the construction of many beautiful limestone buildings, including the first Whipple Hall and the present Shumway Hall. In 1901, Dobbin founded St. James School for younger boys about half a mile north of Shattuck. In 1932, Seabury Theological Seminary merged with Western Theological Seminary and moved to Evanston, Illinois.

In 1972, the three schools, Shattuck, St. Mary's and St. James, were joined into what is known today as Shattuck-St. Mary's. In 1974, the military program was discontinued and the St. James campus was sold.

In 1988, the residential and academic programs were reconfigured so that the Middle School students (grades 6–8) were at the St. Mary's campus and high school students (the Upper School) were at the Shattuck campus. Later, grade 9 moved to the Middle School, and St. Mary's Hall became solely a girls' dorm once again.

In the early 1990s, facing serious financial concerns and declining enrollment, Craig Norwich was hired, a decision that permanently changed the course of the school. Norwich created the model of "centers of excellence." The school owned the only ice arena in Faribault and Norwich decided to use that to its advantage to create a world-class hockey program. Jean Paul (J.P.) Parise and 1980 Gold Medal USA Olympic Hockey Team strength & conditioning coach Larry Hendrickson were also instrumental in starting the SSM Elite hockey program. The model used to build the program has been replicated and flourished under former president Nick Stoneman, and is one of the main reasons for the school's success. The "center of excellence" model has been expanded to include soccer, figure skating, golf, pre-conservatory music, bioscience, engineering, and a vocal performance program. The school has grown 50% in the last 6 years, with students from 31 countries and 39 states.

In mid-2009 the Saint James campus was reacquired. It is used for faculty housing, and part of it is rented out to the Cannon River STEM School for grades K–8. In September 2012 the school opened Fayfield Hall, a new science, technology, engineering, and math building and home to the BioScience and Engineering Centers of Excellence.

Academics
The Upper School, which includes students in grades 10–12 as well as postgraduates, is located on the Shattuck campus. Opportunities include commitment to a Center of Excellence, extracurricular sports, the arts, the honors program, college counseling, and senior leadership and service projects. Located within St. Mary's Hall, less than half a mile from the Upper School, the Middle School program provides students from grades 6–9 with an identity distinct from that of the upperclassmen. Middle School curriculum includes solid preparation in the major disciplines for high school and college work. In addition, a number of team-building activities and social events, as well as family style seating for lunch, help foster a strong, supportive community.

Global education
In 2013, SSM embarked on a three-year partnership with Beijing Bayi School which culminated in the creation of a satellite campus known as SSM-Bayi in Beijing, China. The program offered classes preparing students for the Chinese Huikao examinations as well as a traditional American curriculum featuring Advanced Placement courses and preparation for SAT tests. SSM-Bayi students also had the opportunity to attend summer sessions at the main SSM campus in Faribault. The first contract between the two school lasted until July 2014. Although the partnership on this project has ended, SSM will continue to maintain a globally focused curriculum at the main campus and pursue the creation of further campuses around the world.

Subsequently, SSM has established a branch in Suzhou, China, which lasted just one year. It also planned a campus in Shenzhen, China, but that too failed even before it opened. There is currently a campus in Forest City, Johor, Malaysia. In its second school year (August, 2019), the student population is predominantly from mainland China though it has small numbers of students from other countries (Malaysia, Singapore, Vietnam, Japan and Korea) along with the children of faculty (mostly Americans).

Blended Learning
In the past several years the school has made a foray into blended learning for grades 11–12, a model of education that allows teachers to combine the physical classroom with its online counterpart in order to create individualized learning experiences. The extra time not spent in the classroom allows students involved in the Blended Program to pursue other scholastic interests, including independent research projects, product development, and internships. The school has received attention for its work in developing a Blended Learning curicculum, including a grant from the E.E. Ford Foundation and presentations on the subject at the Online Education Symposium for Independent Schools.

BioScience
The BioScience Program is an experiential academic program for students who intend to pursue a career in medicine, biomedical engineering, or scientific research. The program's curricula includes studies of anatomy, physiology and pathophysiology, and also of social and ethical dilemmas in the medical field. In addition, the BioScience Program offers off campus experiences at biomedical companies, research labs, hospitals, and colleges, and each student is involved in ongoing cancer research. The program is housed within Fayfield Hall, which features laboratory classroom space dedicated solely to BioScience education.

Engineering
In the Fall of 2014, SSM opened the Engineering Program, which primarily consists of foundational and specialized engineering classes, as well as internships organized by the student and Program Director. The program is housed within Fayfield Hall, which includes access to an engineering lab equipped with a 3-D printer, laser cutter, and a mechanical assembly and testing area, as well as an architectural design studio.

Arts

Every student has the opportunity to explore interests in a wide variety of the arts through introductory courses, and advanced study is available through the Centers of Excellence. Alongside these two programs, arts opportunities include the full scale, triannually performed theater productions, as well as Arch Dance Company, theater groups Players and The Dramatic Association, Elements of Sound vocal ensemble, chamber wind ensembles, and AP art courses.

Pre-Conservatory Music
The Pre-Conservatory Program offers serious and talented musicians ample practice time on campus, weekly lessons with Master Teachers at universities in the Twin Cities, courses in music theory, and numerous performance opportunities as a soloist and ensemble member. The program has been referred to as "Prodigy High" due to its success, and has been compared to music programs at top private arts schools.

Vocal Performance
The Vocal Performance Program at Shattuck-St. Mary's is a comprehensive, classical, and foundational music education, centered around ensemble excellence and individual performance opportunities. Enrolled students receive weekly private voice and piano lessons as well as music theory and choral ensemble classes. Students also receive training through Minnesota Opera's Project Opera program and the Hennepin Theater Trust's Spotlight Program.

Athletics

On-campus athletic facilities include two and a half indoor ice arenas, an 18-hole golf course, an all-weather running track, grass soccer fields, a domed indoor field house with a full-size turf soccer field, an outdoor turf soccer field, six tennis courts, two gymnasiums, a spacious weight-room facility, and training facilities fully equipped with an ice bath, whirlpool, ultrasound, and training and rehabilitation resources.

Intramural sports
Along with the Center of Excellence sports, numerous interscholastic sports opportunities are offered in a three-season program and include Basketball, Baseball, Fencing, Golf, Lacrosse, Soccer, Spring League Hockey, Running Club, Tennis, Volleyball, and Ultimate Frisbee. Many Center of Excellence athletes are able to cross-over into these intramural sports for at least one semester a year.

Hockey
The Hockey Center of Excellence comprises four midget teams, two bantam teams, and three girls' teams. All teams play a seven-month schedule, averaging 50–75 games a season, with tournament play throughout the United States and Canada. Since the late 1990s, the program has had a considerable amount of domestic and international success, including a total of 24 USA Hockey National Championships. The school has also gained a reputation as the "Hogwarts of Hockey," and being "to hockey what Harvard is to law." Players go on to compete at the highest levels of collegiate and Junior League Hockey, and in numerous cases, the NHL and the Winter Olympics.

Soccer
Started in 2005, the Soccer Center of Excellence is one of three more recognized soccer residential programs in the country, and the only one to fully combine school and sport. The program has five teams: two girls' and four boys'. More SSM soccer players sign to play for NCAA Division I colleges than any other high school in the country, and the school has produced professional players, such as Teal Bunbury The program is now a competitive member of MLS Next.

Figure skating
Founded in 2006, the Figure Skating Center of Excellence offers the first elite figure skating program integrated with academics in a boarding school environment, and provides a balance between training, competing, and schooling. Skaters compete domestically and internationally, often in national championships in their home countries.

Golf
Founded in 2012, the Golf Center of Excellence allows athletes to compete in American Junior Golf Association and Future Collegians World Tour (FCWT) events, and combines an academic setting with an intensive 10 month golf program. During the spring and fall, practice sessions take place at The Legacy Golf Course, and during the winter an indoor facility is used, including a turf room with a putting and chipping green, a video and putting analysis room with JC Video software and TOMI putting system, and locker rooms. Training through the winter combined with travel to tournaments and events in warmer climates provides experience and exposure to young golfers from the Midwest, where such opportunities are limited.

Notable alumni

Arts and theater
Marlon Brando was a legacy student, Academy Award winner, Class of 1944, expelled prior to graduation.
Jimmy Chin, Academy Award winning National Geographic photographer and mountain climber, Class of 1992, expelled during senior year.
William Blake Herron, author, Class of 1981.
Grace McKinstry, a graduate of St. Mary's Hall, painter who lived in Faribault in the late 1800s and early 1900s.
Alfonso Pichardo, lead singer/songwriter synthpop band Moenia, Class of 1991.
Adelaïde Alsop Robineau, influential ceramist and artist. St.Mary's Hall Class or 1884
Wendy Shon (손승완, RR: Son Seung-wan), member of K-pop girl group, Red Velvet, attended 2007–2010.
Townes Van Zandt, folk music singer-songwriter, performer, and poet, Class of 1962.

Ice hockey
Ben Barr, Head Coach, Maine Black Bears ice hockey
Teddy Blueger, Pittsburgh Penguins forward. Played for Shattuck-Saint Mary's from 2009-2012.
Casey Borer, Carolina Hurricanes, St. Cloud State, Class of 2003.
Brendan Brisson, Henderson Silver Knights player as a prospect of the Vegas Golden Knights. Son of Pat Brisson. Played for Shattuck-Saint Mary's from 2016-2019.
Jeremy Brodeur, Maine Mariners goaltender. Son of NHL and Hockey Hall of Fame goaltender Martin Brodeur. Played for Shattuck-Saint Mary's from 2011-2014.
Ryan Caldwell, formerly of the New York Islanders and Phoenix Coyotes, Class of 1999.
David Carle, Denver Pioneers men's ice hockey coach
Noah Clarke, formerly with Los Angeles Kings, Class of 1997.
Ty Conklin, Detroit Red Wings, University of New Hampshire, Class of 1994.
Joe Corvo, Ottawa Senators, Class of 1995.
Sidney Crosby, Pittsburgh Penguins, attended 2002–2003.
Oscar Dansk, Stockton Heat goaltender under contract with the Calgary Flames. Played for Shattuck-Saint Mary's from 2007-2010.
Brianna Decker, University of Wisconsin Class of 2009.
Ben Eaves, Dallas Stars, Boston College, drafted by Pittsburgh Penguins, Class of 2000.
Patrick Eaves, Anaheim Ducks, Boston College, Class of 2002.
Emerson Etem, Arizona Coyotes, Class of 2009
Alexander Fallstrom, Harvard College drafted by Minnesota Wild, Class of 2009.
Alyssa Gagliardi, Cornell University, Class of 2010.
Conor Garland, Moncton Wildcats, Vancouver Canucks player, played for Shattuck-Saint Mary's in 2010-2011 season.
Erik Haula, University of Minnesota drafted by Minnesota Wild, Class of 2009.
Isaac Howard, Minnesota Duluth Bulldogs men's ice hockey forward, Tampa Bay Lightning first round draft pick. Played for Shattuck-Saint Mary's from 2019-2020.
Jack Johnson, University of Michigan, Pittsburgh Penguins, Class of 2005.
Amanda Kessel, University of Minnesota Class of 2010.
Clayton Keller, Arizona Coyotes forward. Played for Shattuck-Saint Mary's from 2012-2014.
Jackson LaCombe, Anaheim Ducks forward prospect.  Played for Shattuck-Saint Mary's from 2015-2019.
Jocelyne Lamoureux, University of North Dakota Class of 2008.
Monique Lamoureux, University of North Dakota Class of 2008.
Grace Lee 2018 Winter Olympics, Team Korea player, Class of 2019
Ryan Lindgren, New York Rangers defenceman. Played for Shattuck-Saint Mary's from 2011-2014.
Nathan MacKinnon, CHL hockey player Halifax Mooseheads, Colorado Avalanche, 1st overall pick 2013, attended 2009–2011.
Ryan Malone, formerly of the Tampa Bay Lightning, St. Cloud State, Class of 1999.
Ian McCoshen, Henderson Silver Knights defenceman. Played for Shattuck-Saint Mary's from 2009-2010.
Jacob Micflikier, ice hockey player
Brady Murray, Los Angeles Kings, HC Lugano, University of North Dakota, Class of 2003.
Sarah_Murray_ 2018 Winter Olympics, Team Korea Head Coach, Class of 2006
Kyle Okposo, New York Islanders, University of Minnesota Golden Gophers hockey, Class of 2006.
Jordan Parise, EC KAC, University of North Dakota, Class of 2001.
Zach Parise, University of North Dakota hockey, Minnesota Wild, Class of 2002.
Rem Pitlick, Montreal Canadiens forward. Played for Shattuck-Saint Mary's from 2011-2014.
Peter Ratchuk, former NHL defenseman and current Winnipeg Jets scout. Class of 1996.
Mackie Samoskevich, Florida Panthers first round draft pick. Played for Shattuck-Saint Mary's from 2016-2019.
Derek Stepan, New York Rangers, University of Wisconsin hockey, Class of 2008.
David Toews, former ECHL forward, University of North Dakota, Class of 2008.
Jonathan Toews, University of North Dakota hockey, Chicago Blackhawks, Class of 2005.
Oliver Wahlstrom, New York Islanders forward. Played for Shattuck-Saint Mary's from 2014-2016.
Cameron York, Philadelphia Flyers defenceman. Played for Shattuck-Saint Mary's from 2015-2017.

Military and politics
William Benton, former US Senator and former chairman of the board and publisher of the Encyclopædia Britannica, Class of 1917.
Todd Blodgett - Member of White House staff (Reagan-Bush) 1985-87. Served on Bush-Quayle '88 campaign committee. Also worked with the FBI.
Deming Bronson, Medal of Honor recipient.  Class of 1911.
Halstead Dorey, Major general in the Army; recipient of Distinguished Service Cross; Class of 1893
Manton S. Eddy, Lieutenant General, United States Army, Class of 1913.
Daniel W. Hand, U.S. Army brigadier general
Hubert H. "Skip" Humphrey, III, former attorney general and state senator for Minnesota, son of former Vice President Hubert Humphrey, Class of 1961.
Major James L. Jones Sr., Early Pioneer of amphibious reconnaissance, Class of 1930.
Craig R. McKinley, the first officer from the National Guard to ever achieve the grade of a four-star general, and current President of the Air Force Association, Class of 1970.
Richard Moe, former Chief of Staff to the Vice President of the United States under Walter Mondale, and former President of the National Trust for Historic Preservation, Class of 1954.
Frank Tompkins, Colonel in the United States Cavalry and recipient of the Distinguished Service Cross. Class of c. 1886.
Frederick Stephen Upton, Member of the U.S. House of Representatives, representing Michigan's 6th congressional district since 1987, family founded Whirlpool Corporation. Class of 1971.
Russell W. Volckmann, brigadier general, U.S. Army; guerrilla leader, Philippine resistance; founder, U.S. Army Special Forces; Class of 1930.

Other
David Abidor, soccer player
Teal Bunbury, New England Revolution, Class of 2008.
Frederick Mears, American civil and railroad engineer.
Frank Rosebrook Millspaugh, Bishop of Kansas, Class of 1869.
Brent Musburger, sportscaster, Class of 1957.
Thomas Siebel, chairman of First Virtual Group and former founder, chairman, and chief executive officer of Siebel Systems, Class of 1971.
Bud Wilkinson, 3-time consecutive national champion in football (quarterback) at University of Minnesota; Hall Of Fame college football coach, University of Oklahoma; Class of 1933.

Other notable associations
Clifford C. Furnas athlete, educator, public servant, and scientist taught mathematics and track for 2 years at the school.
Andy Murray, former head coach of the ice hockey team for the 1998–99 season.
Walter D. Douglas passenger on the RMS Titanic.
Craig Norwich/ NHL Alumni/ Former Head Coach

References

External links

Shattuck-St Mary's homepage

1858 establishments in Minnesota
Boarding schools in Minnesota
Buildings and structures in Faribault, Minnesota
Educational institutions established in 1858
Episcopal schools in the United States
Gothic Revival architecture in Minnesota
Historic districts on the National Register of Historic Places in Minnesota
Private high schools in Minnesota
School buildings on the National Register of Historic Places in Minnesota
Schools in Rice County, Minnesota
National Register of Historic Places in Rice County, Minnesota
Ice hockey schools
Ice hockey in Minnesota